The eight season of the Romanian reality talent show Vocea României premiered on ProTV on September 7, 2018. Pavel Bartoș returned as host, while Irina Fodor replaced Lili Sandu as the social media correspondent. Laura Giurcanu was the vlogger of the show.   Tudor Chirilă and Smiley returned as coaches, while Irina Rimes and  Andra replaced Loredana Groza and Adrian Despot as coaches.

The season finale aired on December 14, 2018. Bogdan Ioan, mentored by Smiley, was declared winner of the season. It was Smiley's third victory as a coach.

Auditions

The open call auditions were held in the following locations:

Teams
 Color key

Blind auditions

Color key

Episode 1 (September 7) 
The first episode aired on September 7, 2018. The coaches performed "We Will Rock You" at the start of the show.

Episode 2 (September 8) 
The second episode aired on September 8, 2018.

Episode 3 (September 14) 
The third episode aired on September 14, 2018.

Episode 4 (September 21) 
The fourth episode aired on September 21, 2018.

Episode 5 (September 28) 
The fifth episode aired on September 28, 2018.

Episode 6 (October 5) 
The sixth episode aired on October 5, 2018.

Episode 7 (October 12) 
The seventh episode aired on October 12, 2018.

Episode 8 (October 19) 
The eighth and last blind audition episode aired on October 19, 2018.

The Battles
After the Blind auditions, Team Andra and Team Irina had fourteen contestants, while Team Tudor and Team Smiley had fifteen contestants for the Battle rounds. The Battles rounds started with episode 9 on October 26, 2018. Coaches began narrowing down the playing field by training the contestants. Each battle concluding with the respective coach advancing one of the two or three contestants. Each coach could steal one losing contestant from another team.

Color key:

Episode 9 (26 October)
The ninth episode aired on October 26, 2018.

Episode 10 (2 November)
The tenth episode aired on November 2, 2018.

Episode 11 (9 November)
The eleventh episode aired on November 9, 2018.

Episode 12 (16 November)
The twelfth episode aired on November 16, 2018.

Knockout rounds
The remaining eight artists from each team were split up into two groups of four. At the end of each knockout round the coach then decided out of the four artists two of them who won, and therefore made up their four artists to take to the live shows.

Colour key:

Episode 13 (23 November)
The thirteenth episode aired on November 23, 2018.

Episode 14 (24 November)
The fourteenth episode aired on November 24, 2018.

Live shows
Color key:

Week 1 - Top 16 (30 November & 1 December)
The first week comprised episodes 15 and 16. Two contestants from each team competed in each of the first two live shows, which aired on Friday, November 30 and Saturday, December 1, 2018, respectively. In either of the two shows, the public vote could save one contestant from each team, the other one was eliminated.

Week 2 - Semi-final (7 December)
All eight remaining contestants performed two songs each in the semi-final on Friday, December 7, 2018: a solo song and a trio with the coach and the other teammate. The public vote could save one contestant from each team, the second one was eliminated.

Week 3 - Final (14 December)
The top 4 contestants performed in the grand final on Friday, December 14, 2018. This week, the four finalists performed a solo song, a duet with a special guest and a duet with their coach. The public vote determined the winner, and that resulted in a victory for Bogdan Ioan, Smiley's third victory as a coach.

Elimination chart 
Color key
Artist info

Result details

Overall

Ratings

References

2018 Romanian television seasons